Chopstick Brothers are a Beijing-based Chinese duo who became known online by their 2010 viral video Old Boys. In 2014, they wrote, directed, and starred in a full feature film Old Boys: The Way of the Dragon based on the viral video. The promotional song of the film, "Little Apple", also became popular online, winning the "International Song Award" at the American Music Awards of 2014.

Members
Xiao Yang (b. 1980/4/7 in Chengde, Hebei)
Wang Taili (b. 1969/6/1 in Shandong)

Filmography
Fake Fiction (2013)
Old Boys: The Way of the Dragon (2014)
Dragon Blade (2015)
The Amazing Race China 2 (2015; as themselves; finished in third place)
 Super Express (2016; Xiao Yang only)
 Detective Chinatown 2 (2018; Xiao Yang only)
 Sheep Without a Shepherd (2019; Xiao Yang only)
 Endgame (2020)
 Detective Chinatown 3 (2021; Xiao Yang only)
 Sister (2021; Xiao Yang only)

In Videogames 

Little Apple (song) appears in 舞力全开2015 (Chinese Version Of Just Dance 2015).

References

External links
AMAs: China's Chopsticks Brothers Win International Song Award

Artists from Beijing
Chinese filmmakers
Internet memes
Male actors from Beijing
Musicians from Beijing
Chinese comedy duos
Comedy film characters
Film characters introduced in 2007
The Amazing Race contestants